Buddhists, predominantly from India, first actively disseminated their practices in Tibet from the 6th to the 9th centuries CE. During the Era of Fragmentation (9th–10th centuries), Buddhism waned in Tibet, only to rise again in the 11th century. With the Mongol invasion of Tibet (1240 onwards) and the establishment of the  Mongol Yuan dynasty (1271–1368) in China, Tibetan Buddhism spread beyond Tibet to Mongolia and China. From the 14th to the 20th centuries, Tibetan Buddhism was patronized by the Chinese Ming dynasty (1368–1644) and the  Manchurian Qing dynasty (1644–1912) which ruled China.

The Gelugpa school, founded by Je Tsongkhapa (1357–1419), rose to (political) prominence under Ngawang Lobsang Gyatso (1617–1682), the 5th Dalai Lama (in office 1642–1682), who invited the Mongols to intervene in the Tibetan civil war of 1639–1642. The Mongols invested him with the political power of Tibet, leading to the dominance of the Gelugpa until the 20th century. In the 19th century the Rimé movement provided a counter-weight against this dominance, trying to preserve the teachings of the Nyingma, Kagyu and Sakya schools.

In the early 20th century Tibet acquired de facto independence from the Manchurian Qing Empire. Tibetan independence ended  with the Chinese invasion of 1950, which resulted in an exodus of Tibetans. In the 21st century, Tibetan Buddhism continues to have adherents on the Tibetan Plateau and in surrounding regions, while it has also attracted a considerable interest in the Western world.

Pre 6th century
During 3th century, Buddhism begins to spread into Tibetan region and teachings affect Bon religion in Kingdom of Zhangzhung.

Legendary origins (6th century)
According to tradition, in the reign of King Thothori Nyantsen (6th century), a basket of Buddhist scriptures arrived in Tibet from India.

First dissemination (7th–9th centuries)

Songtsän Gampo (7th century)
Sanskrit Buddhist scriptures from Nepal & India were first translated into Tibetan under the reign of the Tibetan king Songtsän Gampo (618–649), who established the Tibetan Empire. Songtsen Gampo is traditionally credited with the introduction of Buddhism to Tibet, influenced by his Nepali consort Bhrikuti, of Nepal's Licchavi dynasty, as well as with the unification of what had previously been several Tibetan kingdoms. It is known that he married a Chinese Tang dynasty Buddhist princess, Wencheng, who came to Tibet with a statue of Shakyamuni Buddha. It is clear from Tibetan sources that some of his successors became ardent Buddhists. The records show that Chinese Buddhists were actively involved in missionary activity in Tibet, but they did not have the same level of imperial support as Indian Buddhists, with tantric lineages from Bihar and Bengal.

By the second half of the 8th century he was already regarded as an embodiment of the Bodhisattva Avalokiteśvara. According to Tibetan traditions, Bhrikuti was a devout Buddhist and brought many sacred images and expert Newari craftsmen with her as part of her dowry. The Red Palace (Mar-po-ri Pho-drang) on Marpo Ri (Red Mountain) in Lhasa, which was later rebuilt into the thirteen storey Potala by the Fifth Dalai Lama, was constructed by Nepali craftsmen according to her wishes. She also had constructed the Tub-wang and other statues in Samye and the famous Nepali artist Thro-wo carved the revered statue of Chenresig, Thungji Chen-po rang-jung nga-ldan. It is also called statue of Mikyo Dorje (Manuvajra) – the Ramoche Jowo or Jowo Chungpa which was housed in the Ramoche Temple in Lhasa. They have been since joined and the statue is surrounded by the Eight Bodhisattvas.

Songtsen Gampo and Bhrikuti built a great temple, the Tsulag Khang (or 'House of Wisdom') to house the images, which is now known as the Jokhang ('House of the Lord') in the heart of Lhasa, and is considered to be the most sacred temple in Tibet.

Bhrikuti is usually represented as Green Tara in Tibetan iconography. Bhrikuti and Wencheng are said to have worked together to establish temples and Buddhism in Tibet.

Indian and Nepalese influences (8th century)

In the 8th century Buddhism really took hold in Tibet. The successors of Songtsän Gampo were less enthusiastic about the propagation of Buddhism, but in the 8th century King Trisong Detsen (755–797) established it as the official religion of the state.

Trisong Detsen invited Indian Buddhist scholars to his court, and Tibetan Buddhists today trace their oldest spiritual roots to the Indian masters Padmasambhāva (8th century) and Śāntarakṣita (725–788), who founded the Nyingma, The Ancient Ones, the oldest school of Tibetan Buddhism. According to Tibetan tradition, Padmasambhāva wrote a number of important scriptures, some of which he hid for future tertons to find; these Terma "treasures" (revealed texts) are of particular significance to the Nyingma school.

At this early time also, from the south came the influence of scholars under the Pāla dynasty in the Indian state of Magadha. They had achieved a blend of Mahāyāna and Vajrayāna that has come to characterize all forms of Tibetan Buddhism. Their teaching in sutra centered on the Abhisamayālankāra, a 4th-century Yogācārin text, but prominent among them were the Mādhyamika scholars Śāntarakṣita and Kamalaśīla.

A third influence was that of the Sarvāstivādins from Kashmir to the southwest and Khotan to the northwest. Although they did not succeed in maintaining a presence in Tibet, their texts found their way into the Tibetan Buddhist canon, providing the Tibetans with almost all of their primary sources about what they regarded to be the Hinayana. A subsect of this school, Mūlasarvāstivāda was the source of the Tibetan vinaya.

Chinese influences (8th century)
The Chinese princess Jincheng Gongzhu (:zh:金城公主) (?–739), known in Tibet as Kim-sheng, and a devout Buddhist, was sent to Tibet in 710 where she married Mes-ag-tshoms.  Buddhist monks from Khotan (Li), fleeing the persecutions of an anti-Buddhist king, were given refuge by Kim-sheng about 737. Kim-sheng died during an outbreak of smallpox sometime between 739 and 741, and anti-Buddhist factions in Tibet began to blame the epidemic on the support of Buddhism by the king and queen. This forced the monks to flee once again; first to Gandhara, and then to Kosambi in central India where the monks apparently ended up quarrelling and slaughtering each other.

Tibetan king Trisong Detsen (742–797) invited the Chan master Moheyan to transmit the Dharma at Samye Monastery. According to Tibetan sources, Moheyan lost the so-called council of Lhasa (793), a debate sponsored by Trisong Detsen on the nature of emptiness with the Indian master Kamalaśīla, and the king declared Kamalaśīlas philosophy should form the basis for Tibetan Buddhism. However, a Chinese source found in Dunhuang written by Mo-ho-yen says their side won, and some scholars conclude that the entire episode is fictitious.

Pioneering Buddhologist Giuseppe Tucci speculated that Mohayen's ideas were preserved by the Nyingmapas in the form of dzogchen teachings. John Myrdhin Reynolds and Sam van Schaik reject this possibility. According to Reynolds, "Except for a brief flirtation with Ch'an in the early days of Buddhism in Tibet in the eighth century, the Tibetans exhibited almost no interest at all in Chinese Buddhism, except for translating a few Sutras from Chinese for which they did not possess Indian originals."

Growth in Tibet (9th century)
From the outset Buddhism was opposed by the native shamanistic Bön religion, which had the support of the aristocracy, but it thrived under royal patronage, reaching a peak under King Rälpachän (r. 817–836). Terminology in translation was standardised around 825, enabling a highly literal translation methodology.

Era of fragmentation (9th–10th centuries)
A reversal in Buddhist influence began under King Langdarma (r. 836–842), and his death was followed by the so-called Era of Fragmentation, a period of Tibetan history in the 9th and 10th centuries. During this era, the political centralization of the earlier Tibetan Empire collapsed. The period was dominated by rebellions against the remnants of imperial Tibet and the rise of regional warlords. Upon the death of Langdarma, the last emperor of a unified Tibetan empire, a civil war ensued, which effectively ended centralized Tibetan administration until the Sa-skya period. Ösung's allies managed to keep control of Lhasa, and Yumtän was forced to go to Yalung, where he established a separate line of kings.

Tibetan Renaissance (10th–12th centuries)

The late 10th and 11th century saw a revival of Buddhism in Tibet. Coinciding with the early discoveries of "hidden treasures" (terma), the 11th century saw a revival of Buddhist influence originating in the far east and far west of Tibet. In the west, Rinchen Zangpo (958–1055) was active as a translator and founded temples and monasteries. Prominent scholars and teachers were again invited from India.

In 1042 Atiśa (982–1054 CE) arrived in Tibet at the invitation of a west Tibetan king. This renowned exponent of the Pāla form of Buddhism from the Indian university of Vikramashila later moved to central Tibet. There his chief disciple, Dromtonpa founded the Kadampa school of Tibetan Buddhism, under whose influence the New Translation schools of today evolved.

The Sakya, the Grey Earth school, was founded by Khön Könchok Gyelpo (1034–1102), a disciple of the great Lotsawa, Drogmi Shākya. It is headed by the Sakya Trizin, traces its lineage to the mahasiddha Virūpa, and represents the scholarly tradition. A renowned exponent, Sakya Pandita (1182–1251CE), was the great-grandson of Khön Könchok Gyelpo.

Other seminal Indian teachers were Tilopa (988–1069) and his student Naropa (probably died c. 1040 CE).The Kagyu, the Lineage of the (Buddha's) Word, is an oral tradition which is very much concerned with the experiential dimension of meditation. Its most famous exponent was Milarepa, an 11th-century mystic. It contains one major and one minor subsect. The first, the Dagpo Kagyu, encompasses those Kagyu schools that trace back to the Indian master Naropa via Marpa Lotsawa, Milarepa and Gampopa

Mongol dominance (13th–14th centuries)

Initial influence on Mongolia (11th–13th centuries)
Tibetan Buddhism exerted a strong influence from the 11th century CE among the peoples of Inner Asia, especially the Mongols. Tantric-style Tibetan Buddhism was possibly first spread to the Mongols via the Tangut state of Western Xia (1038–1227). Buddhists entered the service of the Mongol Empire in the early 13th century. Buddhist monasteries established in Karakorum were granted tax exempt status, though the religion was not given official status by the Mongols until later.

Mongol conquest of Tibet (13th century)
The Mongols invaded Tibet in 1240. The Mongols withdrew their soldiers from Tibet in 1241, and returned to the region in 1244, when Köten delivered an ultimatum, summoning the abbot of Sakya (Kun-dga' rGyal-mtshan) to be his personal chaplain, on pains of a larger invasion were he to refuse. Sakya Paṇḍita took almost 3 years to obey the summons and arrive in the Kokonor region in 1246, and met Prince Köten in Liangzhou the following year. The Mongols had annexed Amdo and Kham to the east, and appointed Sakya Paṇḍita Viceroy of Central Tibet by the Mongol court in 1249.

Tibet was incorporated into the Mongol Empire, retaining nominal power over religious and regional political affairs, while the Mongols managed a structural and administrative rule over the region, reinforced by the rare military intervention.

Yuan dynasty (1271–1368)
Tibetan Buddhism was adopted as the de facto state religion by the Mongol Yuan dynasty (1271–1368), founded by Kublai Khan, that also ruled China.

All variants of Buddhism, such as Chinese, Tibetan and Indian Buddhism flourished, though Tibetan Buddhism was eventually favored at the imperial level under emperor Möngke (1209–1259), who appointed Namo from Kashmir as chief of all Buddhist monks. The top-level department and government agency known as the Bureau of Buddhist and Tibetan Affairs (Xuanzheng Yuan) was set up in Khanbaliq (modern-day Beijing) to supervise Buddhist monks throughout the empire. The Sakya Imperial Preceptors were active at the Yuan court and enjoyed special power. During this period Tibetan Buddhism was practiced not only within the capital Beijing and the Tibetan Plateau, but throughout the country. For instance, Hangzhou, capital of the former Southern Song dynasty and the largest city in the Yuan realm, became an important hub of the activities of Tibetan Buddhism, which took public or official precedence over Han Chinese Buddhism. Similarly, Mount Wutai, the sacred site of Bodhisattva Manjusri and the holy mountain of Chinese Buddhist pilgrims, was greatly influenced by Tibetan Buddhism.

Decline of the Golden Horde and the Ilkhanate (13th–14th centuries)
Among the ruling class of the Mongol khanates of the Golden Horde (1240s–1502) and the Ilkhanate (1256–1335/1353), the two western khanates of the Mongol Empire, Shamanism and Buddhism were once the dominant religions, as in the Yuan dynasty. In the early days, the rulers of both khanates increasingly adopted Tibetan Buddhism, like the Yuan dynasty at that time. However, the Mongol rulers Ghazan of the Ilkhanate and Uzbeg of the Golden Horde converted to Islam in AD 1295 and AD 1313  respectively. The Yuan dynasty based in China and Mongolia became the only division of the Mongol Empire not to embrace Islam, instead favoring Tibetan Buddhism until its demise.

Tibetan independence  (14th–18th centuries)
With the decline of the Yuan dynasty, Central Tibet was ruled by successive families from the 14th to the 17th century, and Tibet would be de facto independent from the mid-14th century on, for nearly 400 years.

Family rule and establishment of Gelugpa school (14th–17th centuries)

Jangchub Gyaltsän (Byang chub rgyal mtshan, 1302–1364) became the strongest political family in the mid-14th century. Military hostilities ended in 1354 with Jangchub Gyaltsän as the unquestioned victor, who established the Phagmodrupa dynasty in that year. He continued to rule central Tibet until his death in 1364, although he left all Mongol institutions in place as hollow formalities. Power remained in the hands of the Phagmodru family until 1434.

The rule of Jangchub Gyaltsän and his successors implied a new cultural self-awareness where models were sought in the age of the ancient Tibetan Kingdom. The relatively peaceful conditions favoured the literary and artistic development. During this period the reformist scholar Je Tsongkhapa (1357–1419) founded the Gelug sect which would have a decisive influence on Tibet's history.

Internal strife within the Phagmodrupa dynasty, and the strong localism of the various fiefs and political-religious factions, led to a long series of internal conflicts. The minister family Rinpungpa, based in Tsang (West Central Tibet), dominated politics after 1435.

In 1565 the Rinpungpa family was overthrown by the Tsangpa dynasty of Shigatse which expanded its power in different directions of Tibet in the following decades and favoured the Karma Kagyu sect. They would play a pivotal role in the events which led to the rise of power of the Dalai Lama's in the 1640s.

Foreign patronage

China
Tibetan Buddhism was patronized by the ethnic Chinese in Ming China after overthrowing Mongol rule, and kept friendly relations with some of the Buddhism religious leaders known as Princes of Dharma and granted some other titles to local leaders including the Grand Imperial Tutor.

Mongolia
During the early period of the Northern Yuan dynasty (1368 - c. 1636), shamanism once again became the sole dominant religion in Mongolia, but the last sixty years before the death of the last khan Ligdan Khan (1588–1643) were marked by intensive penetration of Tibetan Buddhism into Mongolian society. In 1578, Sonam Gyatso was invited to Mongolia and converted Altan Khan to Buddhism along with his tribe (the first Mongol tribe to be so converted). Altan Khan conferred the title "Dalai" on him, "Dalai" being the Mongolian translation of his Tibetan name "Gyatso", which means "sea" or "ocean". This is the origin of the title Dalai Lama. The Ming assisted Altan Khan (1507–1582), King of the Tümed Mongols, when he requested aid in propagating Vajrayana Buddhism. Within 50 years nearly all the Mongols had become Buddhists, including tens of thousands of monks, almost all followers of the Gelug school and loyal to the Dalai Lama. Since then Tibetan Buddhism has played a very important role among the Mongols.

Tibetan Buddhism was the most important religion among the Mongols under Qing rule (1635–1912), as well as the state religion of the Kalmyk Khanate (1630–1771), the Dzungar Khanate (1634–1758) and the Khoshut Khanate (1642–1717). Tibetan Buddhism was also adored by the Manchu Qing court (1644–1912) since both Mongols and Tibetans believed in Tibetan Buddhism. Some historians may view the promotion of Tibetan Buddhism among the Mongols by the Chinese and Manchus as a deliberate plot to weaken the Mongol's military power, but others reject the theory.

Ganden Phodrang government  (17th–18th centuries)

The Ganden Phodrang was the Tibetan regime or government that was established by the 5th Dalai Lama with the help of the Güshi Khan of the Khoshut in 1642. After the civil war in the 17th century and the Mongol intervention, the Gelugpa school dominated Tibetan Buddhism, and successive Dalai Lamas ruled Tibet from the mid-17th to mid-20th centuries.

Beginnings of the Dalai Lama lineage

The rise of the Dalai Lama's was intimately connected with the military power of Mongolian clans. Altan Khan, the king of the Tümed Mongols, first invited Sonam Gyatso, the head of the Gelugpa school of Tibetan Buddhism (later known as the third Dalai Lama), to Mongolia in 1569 and again in 1578, during the reign of the Tsangpa family. Gyatso accepted the second invitation. They met at the site of Altan Khan's new capital, Koko Khotan (Hohhot), and the Dalai Lama taught a huge crowd there.

Sonam Gyatso publicly announced that he was a reincarnation of the Tibetan Sakya monk Drogön Chögyal Phagpa (1235–1280) who converted Kublai Khan, while Altan Khan was a reincarnation of Kublai Khan (1215–1294), the famous ruler of the Mongols and Emperor of China, and that they had come together again to cooperate in propagating the Buddhist religion. While this did not immediately lead to a massive conversion of Mongols to Buddhism (this would only happen in the 1630s), it did lead to the widespread use of Buddhist ideology for the legitimation of power among the Mongol nobility. Last but not least, Yonten Gyatso, the fourth Dalai Lama, was a grandson of Altan Khan.

Rise and dominance of Gelugpa (17th–18th centuries)
Sonam Choephel (1595–1657 CE), the first regent of the fifth Dalai Lama, was "the prime architect of the Gelug's rise to power". Sonam Choephel requested the aid of Güshi Khan, a powerful Dzungar military leader to end decades of clan-wars in Dbus and Gtsang provinces, and the Tibetan civil war of 1639–1642. Güshi Khan (who was head of the Khoshut tribe) conquered Kham in 1640 bringing the Sakyas and the lords of Kham and Amdo under their control.  His victory over Karma Tenkyong, the prince of Tsang in Shigatse, in 1642, completed the military unification of the country and the establishment of the Khoshut Khanate. By this feat the Phagmodrupa dynasty, which was associated with a variant of the Kagyu school, was technically replaced; in fact it had been powerless for many years. By subsequently formally recognizing the Fifth Dalai Lama's authority in 1642, Güshi Khan effectively made Gyatso the temporal ruler of all Tibet.

Qing rule (18th–20th centuries)

Establishment of Qing rule
The Qing dynasty (1644–1912) established their rule over Tibet after a Qing expedition force defeated the Dzungars in 1720, and lasted until the fall of the Qing dynasty in 1912. The Qing emperors appointed imperial residents known as the Ambans to Tibet, who commanded over 2,000 troops stationed in Lhasa and reported to the Lifan Yuan, a Qing government agency that oversaw the region during this period. The rulers of the Manchu Qing dynasty supported Tibetan Buddhism, especially the Gelug sect, for most of their dynasty.

Rimé movement (19th century)

The Rimé movement was a movement involving the Sakya, Kagyu and Nyingma schools of Tibetan Buddhism, along with some Bon scholars. Having seen how the Gelug institutions pushed the other traditions into the corners of Tibet's cultural life, Jamyang Khyentse Wangpo (1820–1892) and Jamgön Kongtrül (1813–1899) compiled together the teachings of the Sakya, Kagyu and Nyingma, including many near-extinct teachings. Without Khyentse and Kongtrul's collecting and printing of rare works, the suppression of Buddhism by the Communists would have been much more final. The Rimé movement is responsible for a number of scriptural compilations, such as the Rinchen Terdzod and the Sheja Dzö.

Modern history (20th–21st centuries)

20th century – de facto independence, Chinese occupation, and Tibetan exodus

In 1912 Tibet became de facto independent again, but was annexed by the Chinese People's republic in 1950. In 1959 the 14th Dalai Lama and a great number of clergy fled the country, to settle in India and other neighbouring countries. This also started the spread of Tibetan Buddhism to western countries, resulting in worldwide communities of Tibetan Buddhism.

21st century – exile and spread abroad
Today, Tibetan Buddhism is adhered to widely in the Tibetan Plateau, Mongolia, northern Nepal, Kalmykia (on the north-west shore of the Caspian), Siberia  (Tuva and Buryatia), the Russian Far East and northeast China. It is the state religion of Bhutan. The Indian regions of Sikkim and Ladakh, both formerly independent kingdoms, are also home to significant Tibetan Buddhist populations, as are the Indian states of Himachal Pradesh (which includes Dharamshala and the district of Lahaul-Spiti), West Bengal (the hill stations of Darjeeling and Kalimpong) and Arunachal Pradesh.

In the wake of the Tibetan diaspora, Tibetan Buddhism has gained adherents in the West and throughout the world. Fully ordained Tibetan Buddhist Monks now work in academia (for example Ven. Alex Bruce ('Tenpa')). The 14th Dalai Lama, Tenzin Gyatso, has traveled the world and spoken about the welfare of Tibetans, environment, economics, women's rights, non-violence, interfaith dialogue, physics, astronomy, Buddhism and science, cognitive neuroscience, reproductive health, and sexuality, along with various Mahayana and Vajrayana topics. He received the Nobel Peace Prize in 1989.

See also
History of Tibet
Tibetan Buddhism
Schools of Buddhism

Notes

References

Sources 

  Buddha Dharma Education Association and Buddhanet. Timeline of Tibetan Buddhism
 Davidson, Ronald M.. Tibet. In: Robert M. Buswell (ed.), Encyclopedia of Buddhism.
 Smith, E. Gene (2001). Among Tibetan Texts: History and Literature of the Himalayan Plateau. Boston: Wisdom Publications. .

Further reading 
  - a concise introduction

External links
 Berzin, Alexander. "Tibetan Buddhism, History & Culture" in Study Buddhism
Tibetan and Himalayan Digital Library: History
 Tibetan Buddhist Resource Center: Historical Writings